Barfly may refer to:
 Barfly (album), 1995 album by the band Buck-O-Nine
 Barfly (club), a music venue in Camden Town, London, UK
 Barfly (film), 1987 American film starring Mickey Rourke and Faye Dunaway
 Barfly, a bar in Montreal on Saint Laurent Boulevard
 Barfly, a comic strip in the Irish music magazine, Hot Press
 Barfly Assembler Development System, a software package for the Amiga
 Bartlesville Barflies, a 1930s barbershop quartet